Khwai River Airport  is an airport serving the lodges and camps around the village of Khwai in Botswana.

The game reserve is on the eastern side of the Okavango Delta.

See also

Transport in Botswana
List of airports in Botswana

References

External links
OpenStreetMap - Khwai River
OurAirports - Khwai River
Fallingrain - Khwai River Airport

Airports in Botswana